State Route 288 heads north from State Route 188 near Roosevelt Lake. SR 288 ends at Young south of State Route 260. Currently, most of SR 288 is unpaved.

Route description
The southern terminus of SR 288 is located on SR 188 southeast of Theodore Roosevelt Lake.  The highway heads north from this intersection through mountainous terrain as it heads towards Young.  Portions of the highway are not paved and it does not intersect any other state highways other than SR 188 at its southern terminus.  The northern terminus is located at an intersection with Chamberlain Trail in Young.  The roadway continues on as a National Forest road.

History 

The route was established in 1959 as a state route. The highway received scenic road designation in 2001.

Junction list

References

288
Transportation in Gila County, Arizona